The men's 4 × 400 metres relay event at the 2002 Asian Athletics Championships was held in Colombo, Sri Lanka on 12 August.

Results

References

2002 Asian Athletics Championships
Relays at the Asian Athletics Championships